The Ministry of Endowment and Religious Affairs of Somaliland  is a Somaliland government is the Somaliland branch of government charged with religious affairs and endowments.
The current minister is Sh.Cabdirisaaq Xuseen Albaani.

See also

 Ministry of Justice (Somaliland)
 Ministry of Finance (Somaliland)
 Ministry of Health (Somaliland)

References

External links
Official Site of the Government of Somaliland

Politics of Somaliland
Government ministries of Somaliland